Horapollo (from Horus Apollo) is the supposed author of a treatise, titled Hieroglyphica, on Egyptian hieroglyphs, extant in a Greek translation by one Philippus, dating to about the 5th century.

Life
Horapollo is mentioned by the Suda (ω 159) as one of the last leaders of the Egyptian priesthood at a school in Menouthis, near Alexandria, during the reign of Zeno (AD 474–491).
 
According to the Suda, Horapollo had to flee because he was accused of plotting a revolt against the Christians, and his temple to Isis and Osiris was destroyed. Horapollo was later captured and after torture converted to Christianity. Another, earlier, Horapollo alluded to by the Suda was a grammarian from Phanebytis, under Theodosius II (AD 408–450). To this Horapollo the Hieroglyphica was attributed by most 16th-century editors, although there were more occult opinions, identifying Horapollo with Horus himself, or with a pharaoh.

Horapollo wrote commentaries on Sophocles, Alcaeus of Mytilene and Homer, and a work on places consecrated to the gods. Photius (cod. 279), who calls him a dramatist as well as a grammarian, ascribes to him a history of the foundation and antiquities of Alexandria (unless this is by an Egyptian of the same name, who lived in the reign of Zeno, 474–491).

Hieroglyphica
The text of the Hieroglyphica consists of two books, containing a total of 189 explanations of Egyptian hieroglyphs. The books profess to be a translation from an Egyptian original into Greek by a certain Philippus, of whom nothing is known. The inferior Greek of the translation, and the character of the additions in the second book point to its being of late date; some have even assigned it to the 15th century. The text was discovered in 1419 on the island of Andros, and was taken to Florence by Cristoforo Buondelmonti (it is today kept at the Biblioteca Laurenziana, Plut. 69,27). By the end of the 15th century, the text became immensely popular among humanists and was translated into Latin by Giorgio Valla (in ms. Vat. lat. 3898). The first printed edition of the text appeared in 1505 (published by Manuzio), and was translated into Latin in 1517 by Filippo Fasanini, initiating a long sequence of editions and translations. From the 18th century, the book's authenticity was called into question, but modern Egyptology regards at least the first book as based on real knowledge of hieroglyphs, although confused, and with baroque symbolism and theological speculation, and the book may well originate with the latest remnants of the Egyptian priesthood of the 5th century.

Though a very large proportion of the statements seem absurd and cannot be accounted for by anything known in the latest and most fanciful usage, there is ample evidence in both books, in individual cases, that the tradition of the values of the hieroglyphic signs was not yet extinct in the days of their author.

This approach of symbolic speculation about hieroglyphs (many of which were originally simple syllabic signs) was popular during Hellenism, whence the early Humanists, down to Athanasius Kircher, inherited the preconception of the hieroglyphs as a magical, symbolic, ideographic script. In 1556, the Italian humanist Pierio Valeriano Bolzani published a vast Hieroglyphica at Michael Isengrin's printing press in Basle, which was originally planned as an exegesis of Horapollo's. It was dedicated to Cosimo I de' Medici. 

The second part of book II treats animal symbolism and allegory, essentially derived from  Aristotle, Aelian, Pliny and Artemidorus, and is probably an addition by the Greek translator.

Editions by C. Leemans (1835) and A. T. Cory (1840) with English translation and notes; see also G. Rathgeber in Ersch and Gruber's Allgemeine Encyclopädie; H. Schafer, Zeitschrift für ägyptische Sprache (1905), p. 72.

Select editions
 Aldus Manutius, Venice 1505 (editio princeps)
 George Boas, New York 1950 (English translation), reprinted  1993 .
 Orapollo, I geroglifici, Rizzoli, Milan 1996 .

See also
Athanasius Kircher
Hermes Trismegistos

References

Jan Assmann. Moses the Egyptian: The Memory of Egypt in Western Monotheism. .

External links
A translation of Horapollo's entry in Suda
The Hieroglyphics of Horapollo, tr. Cory 1840
Horapollo (studiolum.com)
 Horapollo, Delli segni hierogliphici, Venecia 1547 etext of Ferrari's edition (studiolum.com)
 ΙΕΡΟΓΛΥΦΙΚΑ

5th-century books
Egyptian hieroglyphs
Egyptology
Hermeticism